Dirk Alan Shafer (November 7, 1962 – March 5, 2015) was an American model, actor, screenwriter and director. Born in Carbondale, Illinois, he was most noted in the modeling world for having  been Playgirl magazine's 1992 "Man of the Year". Shafer related that he did Playgirl for "validation" as a model because he never believed himself to be attractive. Shafer wrote, directed and starred in Man of the Year, a 1995 mockumentary about his time as a semi-closeted gay man in the role of a heterosexual sex symbol. Shafer's next directorial project was Circuit, a fictional look at the world of gay male circuit parties.

As of 2008 Shafer was working as a fitness trainer and certified Pilates instructor. In 2012, Shafer returned to the pages of Playgirl for a 20th anniversary photo spread in the August issue.

Shafer was found dead in a vehicle near his home in West Hollywood, California on March 5, 2015. Initial reports indicated he might have suffered a heart attack. Following an autopsy, however, the Los Angeles County Coroner's office determined Shafer's death was the result of "methamphetamine and cocaine toxicity", with hypertensive cardiovascular disease possibly being a contributing factor.

Shafer is buried at Hollywood Forever Cemetery.

Filmography

As actor
 Will & Grace episode "Cheaters" - Blaze (2001)
 Man of the Year - Himself (1995)

As director
 Circuit (2001)
 Man of the Year (1995)

As writer
 Circuit (2001) (with Gregory Hinton)
 Man of the Year (1995)
 Inside Out II (segment "Double Vision") (1992)

Notes

References
 Kramer, Gary M. (2006). Independent Queer Cinema: Reviews and Interviews. Haworth Press. .

External links

Dirk Shafer on Find A Grave

1962 births
2015 deaths
Male models from Illinois
American male screenwriters
American gay actors
American gay writers
LGBT film directors
Gay models
LGBT people from Illinois
American LGBT screenwriters
People from Carbondale, Illinois
Playgirl Men of the Month
Playgirl Men of the Year
Burials at Hollywood Forever Cemetery
Film directors from Illinois
Screenwriters from Illinois
21st-century LGBT people